Syugut is a rural locality (a selo) in Tsakhurskoye Rural Settlement, Rutulsky District, Republic of Dagestan, Russia. The population was 167 as of 2010. There is 1 street.

Geography 
Syugut is located on the Samur river, 38 km northwest of Rutul (the district's administrative centre) by road. Muslakh and Tsakhur are the nearest rural localities.

Nationalities 
Tsakhurs live there.

References 

Rural localities in Rutulsky District